Merinus is a genus of darkling beetles in the family Tenebrionidae. There is at least one described species in Merinus, M. laevis.

References

Further reading

 
 
 
 
 
 

Tenebrionidae